Club León Femenil is a Mexican professional women's football club based in León, Guanajuato, Mexico that competes in the Liga MX Femenil. The club has been the women's section of Club León since 2017.

Personnel

Management

Coaching staff

Players

Current squad
As of 2 February 2023

References

Club León (women)
Liga MX Femenil teams
Association football clubs established in 2017
2017 establishments in Mexico
Women's association football clubs in Mexico